Events from the year 1691 in Denmark

Incumbents
 Monarch – Christian V

Events
 10 November – A new dock is inaugurated at the Royal Naval Shipyard at Bremerholm.

Undated
 The Danish government gives up its policy of import restrictions as a result of pressure from the Netherlands.
 Nygade in Copenhagen is created as a result of a fire in 1685.
 Taphus on St. Thomas in the Danish West Indies is renamed to Amalienborg.

Births

Deaths
 27 October – Jacob Severin, merchant (died 1753)

References

 
Denmark
Years of the 17th century in Denmark